In Mesopotamian marriage law, marriage was regarded as a legal contract, and divorce as its breakup were similarly affected by official procedures.

References

Marriage
Marriage law by country